Major James Richard Edwards Harden OBE DSO MC (12 December 1916 – 22 October 2000), known as Richard Harden, was a Northern Irish politician.  Born in Tandragee, County Armagh and educated at Bedford School and the Royal Military College, Sandhurst.  He was an Ulster Unionist Member of Parliament for Armagh from a by-election in 1948 until he resigned his seat on 5 November 1954 by the procedural device of accepting the nominally-paid position of Steward of the Manor of Northstead.

Notes

References

External links
"Obituary: Major Richard Harden", Daily Telegraph, 27 October 2000

1916 births
2000 deaths
People from Tandragee
Ulster Unionist Party members of the House of Commons of the United Kingdom
Members of the Parliament of the United Kingdom for County Armagh constituencies (since 1922)
UK MPs 1945–1950
UK MPs 1950–1951
UK MPs 1951–1955
Military personnel from County Armagh
Royal Tank Regiment officers
British Army personnel of World War II
People educated at Bedford School
Graduates of the Royal Military College, Sandhurst
Companions of the Distinguished Service Order
Recipients of the Military Cross
Royal Irish Fusiliers officers
Deputy Lieutenants of Armagh